Jon Murphy may refer to:
Sir Jon Murphy (police officer) (born 1958), British police officer, Chief Constable of Merseyside
Jon Murphy (fighter) (born 1977), American mixed martial arts fighter

See also
Jonathan Murphy (disambiguation)
John Murphy (disambiguation)